Muckshaw Ponds, in Fredon Township, New Jersey, are home to the Revolutionary War hideout of Lieutenant James Moody. Moody, a local legend, was a Loyalist recruiter who combed the Delaware River corridor and hid in limestone caves near Muckshaw Pond (the caves are on private property) so he could raid local farms. The legend says that Moody and his gang hid precious gems and jewels in those caves and were captured before they could retrieve them.

A historical placard that tells his tale is located at the Dennis Library in nearby Newton.

Muckshaw Pond Preserve
Muckshaw Pond Preserve is 530-acre nature reserve owned and managed by the Nature Conservancy in Fredon Township and Andover Township, New Jersey that includes the ponds.  The preserve features a series of trails that display the diverse ecological area around the three interconnected ponds. Trails are open from dawn to dusk.

External links
Muckshaw Ponds Preserve

Protected areas of Sussex County, New Jersey
Lakes of New Jersey
Fredon Township, New Jersey
Nature Conservancy preserves
Nature reserves in New Jersey
Lakes of Sussex County, New Jersey